The All-American Boy is a 1973 American drama film written and directed by Charles Eastman. The film stars Jon Voight, E. J. Peaker, Nancie Phillips, Art Metrano, Kathy Mahoney, Carole Androsky and Jeanne Cooper. The film was released by Warner Bros. on October 24, 1973.

Plot

Vic Bealer, a young boxer from a small town in Texas who is known by his ring name "The Bomber," is seemingly on his way to big things, undefeated as an amateur and a possibility to make the U.S. Olympic boxing team.

Without explanation, Vic walks away from it all, including his family, his fiancée and his fighting career. Disaffected and disillusioned, he enters into relationships with small-town girls Janelle and Drenna, while trainer Arty wonders if the Bomber will ever return.

Cast  

Jon Voight as Vic Bealer
Nancie Phillips as Connie Swooze
Art Metrano as Jay David Swooze
Kathy Mahoney as Shereen Bealer
Carole Androsky as Rodine Bealer
Jeanne Cooper as Nola Bealer
Peggy Cowles as Bett Van Daumee 
Bob Hastings as Ariel Van Daumee
E. J. Peaker as Janelle Sharkey
Ned Glass as Arty Bale
Ray Ballard as Ring Announcer
Anne Archer as Drenna Valentine
Ron Burns as Larking
Harry Northup as Parker
Rosalind Cash as Poppy
Gene Borkan as Rockoff
Leigh French as Lovette
Jeff Thompson as High Valentine
Mac Chandler as Saragusa
Owen Harian as Knipchild
Jaye P. Morgan as Magda Valentine

See also
 List of American films of 1973

References

External links 
 
 

1973 films
1970s sports drama films
American sports drama films
American boxing films
1970s English-language films
Warner Bros. films
1973 directorial debut films
1973 drama films
1970s American films